The  is a Korean weapon which is first described in the Muyesinbo, a Korean martial arts manual published in 1759. It later also found its way into the Muyedobotongji (1791). 

The weapon is a spear with a flag attached to the pole. The  is also called  (단창), which means 'short spear'. It is typically around 2.75 metres long. The blade measures about 23 centimetres in length. These spears were generally used for ceremonial or escort purposes.

Another chapter in the Muyedobotongji is also called  (騎槍), but deals with techniques for using the spear from atop a horse. The hanja is different, 旗 refers to a banner or flag, whereas 騎 refers to riding a horse (i.e.. cavalry vs. infantry).

References

Traditional Korean weapons
Polearms
Spears